735 Naval Air Squadron (735 NAS) was a Naval Air Squadron of the Royal Navy's Fleet Air Arm. It was active between 1943 and 1946 as an ASV (Air-to-Surface Vessel) radar Training Unit. Forming at RNAS Inskip in 1943, roughly one year later the squadron moved to RNAS Burscough. Various flights from the squadron moved on to form other Naval Air Squadrons, with 735 NAS eventually disbanding in 1946.

History of 735 NAS

ASV Training Unit (1943 - 1946) 

735 Naval Air Squadron was formed at RNAS Inskip (HMS Nightjar), located near the village of Inskip, Lancashire, England, on the 1 August 1943, as an A.S.V. training unit and staying there until the 18 March 1944. The squadron flew the Fairey Swordfish I & II and the Avro Anson I aircraft. The Avro Ansons were used for both A.S.H. (Airborne to Surface Homing) and A.S.V. radar training. 735 NAS originally comprised two flights, ‘A’ flight being concerned with radar training and ‘B’ flight engaged in radar trials.

‘C’ flight was added, which acted as a mobile unit giving Rebecca (radar system) training to fighter pilots. This was equipped with three Grumman Hellcat Mk I and a single Avro Anson Mk I aircraft.

In February 1945 ‘B’ flight broke away and became 707 NAS. The following month ‘C’ flight became 787X flight at RAF Odiham.

735 NAS remained at RNAS Burscough after World War Two, continuing to operate Anson and Barracuda aircraft. In November 1945, 737 NAS was absorbed, however, on the 30 April 1946, the squadron disbanded.

Aircraft flown

The squadron has flown a number of different aircraft types, including:
 Fairey Swordfish I (Aug 1943-Mar 1944)
 Fairey Swordfish II (Aug 1943-Mar 1944)
 Avro Anson I (Aug 1943-Apr 1946)
 Fairey Barracuda II (Dec 1944-Apr 1946)
 Fairey Barracuda III (Dec 1944-Apr 1946)
 Grumman Hellcat (Jan 1945-May 1945)

Naval Air Stations 

735 Naval Air Squadron operated from a couple of naval air stations of the Royal Navy, in England:
Royal Naval Air Station INSKIP (1 August 1943 - 18 March 1944)
Royal Naval Air Station BURSCOUGH (18 March 1944 - 30 April 1946)

Commanding Officers 

List of commanding officers of 735 Naval Air Squadron with month and year of appointment and end:
 Lt-Cdr E. S. Carver, DSC, RN (Aug 1943 - Mar 1944)
 Lt-Cdr(A) R. T. Hayes, RNVR (Mar 1944 - Aug 1944)
 Lt-Cdr(A) J. H. Mayne, RNVR (Aug 1944 - Mar 1945)
 Lt-Cdr(A) S.L. Revett, DSC, RNVR (Mar 1945 - Dec 1945)
 Lt-Cdr F. Stovin-Bradford, DSC, RN (Dec 1945 - Apr 1946)

References

Citations

Bibliography

700 series Fleet Air Arm squadrons
Military units and formations established in 1943
Military units and formations of the Royal Navy in World War II